Most species of Crataegus (hawthorn) have red fruit, some have yellow fruit, and a number of species can have black or purple fruit.

Eurasian species 
 C. ambigua
 C. caucasica
 C. chlorosarca, Asian
 C. clarkei, Asian
 C. dzairensis
 C. ×dsungarica
 C. heterophylloides
 C. jozana
 C. karadaghensis
 C. longipes
 C. maximowiczii has fruit that are red to purple-black
 C. nigra, European
 C. pallasii
 C. pentagyna, European
 C. ×pseudazarolus  has fruit that vary from orange to blackish
 C. sakranensis
 C. ×rubrinervis
 C. songarica, Asian
 C. ×zangezura

North American species 
 C. ambigens, series Silvicolae, eastern, fruit "greenish-yellow becoming dark purplish-red"
 C. angulata, series Pruinosae, eastern, fruit "light yellowish green becoming dark purplish-red"
 C. aquacervensis, western, fruit are deep red to purple
 C. atrovirens, western
 C. brachyacantha, native to the southern U.S.
 C. castlegarensis, western
 C. cupressocollina, western
 C. douglasii, Northern and Western
 C. enderbyensis, western
 C. erythropoda, western
 C. okanaganensis, western
 C. okennonii, western
 C. orbicularis, western
 C. phippsii, western
 C. purpurella, western
 C. radina, series Silvicolae, eastern, fruit "yellow-green to dark purplish-red"
 C. rivularis, western
 C. rivuloadamensis, western
 C. saligna, western
 C. shuswapensis, western
 C. suksdorfii, western

The Kutenai called black hawthorn berries kasha (Ktunaxa: kaǂa).

See also 
 List of hawthorn species with yellow fruit

Sources 

 Christensen, K.I. 1992. Revision of Crataegus sect. Crataegus and nothosect. Crataeguineae (Rosaceae-Maloideae) in the Old World. Systematic Botany Monographs 35: 1–199.
 Phipps, J.B., O’Kennon, R.J., and Lance, R.W. 2003. Hawthorns and medlars. Royal Horticultural Society, Cambridge, U.K.
 Phipps, J.B.; O’Kennon, R.J. (1998). Three new species of Crataegus (Rosaceae) from Western North America: C. okennonii, C. okanaganensis, and C. phippsii. Sida Contributions to Botany. 18(1): 169–191.
 Phipps, J.B.; O’Kennon, R.J. (2002). New Taxa of Crataegus (Rosaceae) from the Northern Okanagan-Southwestern Shuswap diversity center. Sida Contributions to Botany. 20(1): 115–144.
 Phipps, J.B.; O'Kennon, R.J. (2007). Hawthorns (Crataegus: Rosaceae) of the Cypress Hills, Alberta and Saskatchewan. Journal of the Botanical Research Institute of Texas. 1(2): 1031–1090.

 
Medicinal plants